This article contains the discography of Finnish singer Robin Packalen and includes information relating to his album and single releases.

Albums

Studio albums

Remix albums

Compilation albums

Extended plays

Singles

References 

Pop music discographies
Discographies of Finnish artists